Leave It to Henry is a 1949 American comedy film directed by Jean Yarbrough and written by D.D. Beauchamp. The film stars Raymond Walburn, Walter Catlett, Gary Gray, Mary Stuart, Barbara Brown and Houseley Stevenson. The film was released on June 12, 1949, by Monogram Pictures.

Plot

Cast          
Raymond Walburn as Henry Latham
Walter Catlett as Mayor George Colton
Gary Gray as David Latham
Mary Stuart as Barbara Latham
Barbara Brown as Edna Latham
Houseley Stevenson as Mr. McCluskey
Ida Moore as Aunt Martha
Olin Howland as Milo Williams 
Pat Phelan as Jim McCluskey
George McDonald as Georgie Colton
Maynard Holmes as Truck Driver
Burk Symon as Judge
William Vedder as Jeweler
Harry Harvey Sr. as Attorney

References

External links
 

1949 films
American comedy films
1949 comedy films
Monogram Pictures films
Films directed by Jean Yarbrough
American black-and-white films
1940s English-language films
1940s American films